The Praga Bohema is an upcoming high-performance limited-production sports car manufactured by Czech marque Praga. Deliveries are expected to start in 2023, and will be limited to 89 units, to celebrate Praga's 89th anniversary since Praga's victory at the 1933 1000 Miles of Czechoslovakia.

Specifications
Although the Bohema is heavily oriented towards track performance, it maintains several features that somewhat preserve its useability as a road car, such as storage bins located at the rear wheel arches and Alcantara stitching in the interior.

Power is sent through the rear wheels via a 6-speed Hewland sequential manual transmission, to tyres shod in Pirelli Trofeo R (305/30 ZR19 102Y rear, 245/40 ZR18 97Y front). This arrangement allows for the interchangeability of road tyres with track-only Michelin slicks, which are the same size. Extensive use of carbon fibre throughout the car including its chassis gives it a kerb weight of just under .

References

Praga vehicles
Cars introduced in 2022